List of United States Navy ships present at Pearl Harbor, December 7, 1941, including commissioned warships and service auxiliaries, but not yard craft assigned to the Fourteenth Naval District. Destroyer Division 80, consisting of the four old destroyers Allen, Chew, Schley, and Ward; USCG cutter ; gunboat Sacramento; and auxiliaries Cockatoo, Condor, Crossbill, Reedbird, and Sunnadin were part of Fourteenth Naval District. The remainder listed were assigned to the Pacific Fleet.

Units

See also 
 Attack on Pearl Harbor
 
 USS Ash

External links 
 Ships Present at Pearl Harbor, 0800 7 December 1941 - Naval History and Heritage Command
 Pearl Harbor Action Reports, 7 Dec 1941

Attack on Pearl Harbor